The Anti-Tank Mine, General Service, Mark III (or "Mark III mine") was a British anti-tank mine used during World War II. The mine had a cylindrical tin lower body with a steel pressure plate which sits on top of a shear-wire restrained spring-loaded striker. Sufficient pressure on the cover shears the restraining wire, allowing the striker spring to push the striker into a  percussion cap. The flash from the percussion cap is transferred to the No.27 detonator which sits in the centre of the mine, detonating the device.

References

 NAVORD OP 1665, British Explosive Ordnance, Naval Ordnance Systems Command (Updated 1970)

Anti-tank mines of the United Kingdom
World War II weapons of the United Kingdom